The 2019 Nigerian House of Representatives elections in Ogun State was held on February 23, 2019, to elect members of the House of Representatives to represent Ogun State, Nigeria.

Overview

Summary

Results

Abeokuta North/Obafemi Owode/Odeda 
A total of 20 candidates registered with the Uzo Independent National Electoral Commission to contest in the election. APC candidate Olumide Osoba won the election, defeating APM Mukaila Kazzim and  18 other party candidates. Osoba received 42.48% of the votes, while Kazzim received 18.88%.

Abeokuta South 
A total of 22 candidates registered with the Independent National Electoral Commission to contest in the election. APC candidate Lanre Edun won the election, defeating PDP Anthony Adeyemi-Showunmi and 20 other candidates. Edun received 35.68% of the votes, while Adeyemi-Showunmi received 18.06%.

Ado-Odo/Ota 
A total of 20 candidates registered with the Independent National Electoral Commission to contest in the election. APC candidate Jimoh Ojugbele won the election, defeating PDP Olusegun Sunmonu and 18 other party candidates. Ojugbele received 36.91% of the votes, while Sunmonu received 24.11%.

Egbado North/Imeko-Afon 
A total of 16 candidates registered with the Independent National Electoral Commission to contest in the election. ADC candidate Jimoh Aremu won the election, defeating APM Abiodun Adebayo and 14 other candidates. Aremu received 35.12% of the votes, while Adebayo received 20.34%.

Egbado South and Ipokia 
A total of 17 candidates registered with the Independent National Electoral Commission to contest in the election. APM candidate Kolawole Lawal won the election, defeating APC Olubiyi Otegbeye and 15 other candidates. Lawal received 34.22% of the votes, while Otegbeye received 28.79%.

Ifo/Ewekoro 
A total of 7 candidates registered with the Independent National Electoral Commission to contest in the election. APC candidate Ibrahim Isiaka won the election, defeating PDP Adedamola Abdulateef and 5 other party candidates. Isiaka received 46.18% of the votes, while Abdulateef received 21.68%.

Ijebu North/Ijebu East/Ogun Waterside 
A total of 19 candidates registered with the Independent National Electoral Commission to contest in the election. PDP candidate Adekoya Adesegun won the election, defeating APC Sulaiman Olubiyi and 17 other party candidate. Adesegun received 50.33% of the votes, while Olubiyi received 39.55%.

Ijebu Ode/Odogbolu/Ijebu North East 
A total of 20 candidates registered with the Independent National Electoral Commission to contest in the election. APC candidate Kolapo Osunsanya won the election, defeating PDP Kabir Shote and 18 other candidates. Osunsanya received 45.70% of the votes, while Shote received 38.86%. In September 2019, a National and State Assembly Election Petitions Tribunal voided the election and called a by-election which Osunsanya won.

Ikenne/Shagamu/Remo North 
A total of 18 candidates registered with the Independent National Electoral Commission to contest in the election. APC candidate Adewunmi Onanuga won the election, defeating PDP Isiaka Lawal and 16 other candidates. Onanuga received 40.76% of the votes, while Lawal received 39.76%.

Notes

References 

House of Representatives
Ogun